FC Slovan Rosice is a Czech football club located in Rosice in the South Moravian Region. After promotion from the Czech Fourth Division in 2019, the club plays in the Moravian–Silesian Football League.

Historical names 
 1909 – SK Slovan Rosice (Sportovní klub Slovan Rosice)
 1954 – TJ Slovan Rosice (Tělovýchovná jednota Slovan Rosice)
 1999 – FC Slovan Rosice (Football Club Slovan Rosice)

Czech Cup
In the 2012–13 Czech Cup, Rosice knocked out Czech First League side FC Zbrojovka Brno at the second round stage, eventually progressing to the fourth round.

References

External links
 Official website 

Football clubs in the Czech Republic
Brno-Country District
Association football clubs established in 1909